Cora pikynasa is a species of basidiolichen in the family Hygrophoraceae. Found in Colombia, it was formally described as a new species in 2016 by Jean-Marc Torres, Bibiana Moncada, and Robert Lücking. The specific epithet pikynasa derives from pi'ky nasa, a Nasa indigenous word meaning "community work", which references the help given to the authors by the Nasa people in gaining access to the collection site. Here it grows as an epiphyte on páramo shrubs.

References

pikynasa
Lichen species
Lichens described in 2016
Lichens of Colombia
Taxa named by Robert Lücking
Basidiolichens